Campeonato Nacional da I Divisão de Futsal (English: Futsal National Championship First Division), also known as Liga Placard for sponsorship reasons is the premier professional futsal league in Portugal. Sporting CP are the current champions, having won a record 17 titles.

Format
The current format, in place since the 2013/14 season has each of the 14 teams play each other twice, home and away during the regular season in a total of 26 rounds. The top 8 teams then proceed to the playoffs, where the 1st place team plays the 8th place, the 2nd place plays the 7th place, the 3rd place plays the 6th place and the 4th place plays the 5th place. The quarter-finals and semi-finals are played in 1-1-1 format, with the highest-ranked team during the regular season playing at home in the first and, if needed the third game. The final takes place over 5 games in a 2-2-1 format, with the highest-ranked team during the regular season playing the first two games and the fifth game, if needed, at home.

The last two teams in the regular season are relegated to the 2nd Division for the next season, being replaced by the two finalists in the 2nd Division playoff.

2021–22 season teams

Portuguese champions

Performance by club

Media coverage
As of the 2020–21 season, Sport TV and Canal 11 are the official broadcasters of the league. Both Benfica and Sporting CP home games are also broadcast on Benfica TV and Sporting TV, respectively.

External links
 

Futsal competitions in Portugal
futsal
Portugal
1990 establishments in Portugal
Sports leagues established in 1990